Nohokomeen Glacier is in North Cascades National Park in the U.S. state of Washington, in a cirque on the north slope of Jack Mountain. In the last 20 years the retreating glacier has exposed a new small lake at 6260 feet. Overall the glacier is retreating at a slower than average rate less of than 100 yards over the last seventeen years, and less than 900 feet in the last 46 years. This is mostly likely caused by the high attitude of the glacier; many of the glaciers in the Cascades are lower in elevation by up to a thousand vertical feet.

See also
List of glaciers in the United States

References

Glaciers of the North Cascades
Glaciers of Whatcom County, Washington
Glaciers of Washington (state)